Bajna is a village in Komárom-Esztergom county, Hungary. Its main attraction is the Sándor-Metternich mansion.

History
detailed information in Hungarian language:Bajna

Details
An old Hungarian family take the name of this village since the beginning of the 15th century : Both de Bothfalva et Bajna (hu : Bajnai Both).

Next events
2010.may.2 Borút (open cellars for taste local wines.)
2010.jun.31 Főzőverseny és borudvar (Cooking Competition and Wine Yard)
2010.sept.4 Viselet Napja (Traditional clothing's day. Local and other clothing from Carpathian Basin)

External links
 Street map (Hungarian)
 http://www.bajna.hu

Populated places in Komárom-Esztergom County